Hashim Sayed Isa Hasan Radhi Hashim (born 3 April 1998) is a Bahraini footballer who plays as a forward for Bahraini Premier League club Al-Riffa and the Bahrain national team.

Club career

Malkiya 
On 12 February 2018, Isa scored two goals against Al-Suwaiq in his club debut in the AFC Cup.

Al-Riffa 
On 19 June 2019, Al-Riffa announced the signing of Isa on a four-year contract.

Career statistics

International 
Scores and results list Bahrain's goal tally first.

References

External links
 
 

1998 births
Living people
People from Manama
Bahraini footballers
Association football forwards
Riffa SC players
Malkiya Club players
Bahraini Premier League players
Bahrain youth international footballers
Asian Games competitors for Bahrain
Footballers at the 2018 Asian Games
Bahrain international footballers